Richard Weaver was a member of the Wisconsin State Assembly and the Wisconsin State Senate.

Biography
Weaver was born on August 25, 1827, in Sussex, England. He moved to Oneida County, New York before settling in what is now Lisbon, Waukesha County, Wisconsin in 1837. On November 22, 1848, Weaver married Rhoda Stone. They would have a daughter. Weaver died on December 26, 1906. He was buried in Sussex, Wisconsin.

His father, James Weaver, and brother, Thomas Weaver, were also members of the Assembly.

Legislative career
Weaver was a member of the Assembly during the 1878 session before representing the 10th District in the Senate during the 1880 and 1881 sessions. He was a Democrat.

References

External links

People from Sussex
English emigrants to the United States
People from Oneida County, New York
People from Lisbon, Waukesha County, Wisconsin
Democratic Party Wisconsin state senators
Democratic Party members of the Wisconsin State Assembly
1827 births
1906 deaths
Burials in Wisconsin
19th-century American politicians